Josef Ibrahim (born 13 March 1991) is a Swedish professional footballer who plays as a left midfielder for BK Forward.

Career
He has spent the majority of his career playing for Swedish and Finnish clubs, most notably Örebro SK and IFK Mariehamn.

On 10 August 2018, Ibrahim signed with Degerfors IF on a contract running until 2020. Degerford announced on 14 February 2019, that they had loaned Ibrahim back to his former club BK Forward for the 2019 season.

References

External links
Josef Ibrahim at Soccerway

1991 births
Living people
Swedish footballers
Swedish expatriate footballers
Association football forwards
Örebro SK players
Syrianska FC players
Allsvenskan players
Superettan players
BK Forward players
Veikkausliiga players
IFK Mariehamn players
FC Åland players
Degerfors IF players
Swedish expatriate sportspeople in Finland
Expatriate footballers in Finland
Assyrian footballers
Footballers from Stockholm